Levon Shant (born Levon Nahashbedian, then changed to Levon Seghposian; 6 April 1869 – 29 November 1951) was an Armenian playwright, novelist, poet and founder of the Hamazkayin Armenian Educational and Cultural Society.

Biography 
He was a lifelong member of the Armenian Revolutionary Federation and is the namesake of the ARF's Shant Student Association. He attended Armenian school at Scutari (Uskudar) until 1884 and then went to the Gevorgian seminary at Echmiadzin until 1891. He returned to Constantinople to teach and write; his first literary work was accepted by the daily Hairenik of that city in 1891. He departed to Germany in 1893 for six years to study science, child psychology, education, literature and history in the universities of Leipzig, Jena and Munich. Afterwards he returned to Constantinople, where he continued working as a teacher. As an author, he was most renowned for his plays: Hin Astvadsner ('Ancient Gods', 1908), Kaisre ('The Emperor', 1914), Inkads Berdi Ishkhanuhin ('The Princess of the Fallen Castle', 1921), Oshin Payl (1929). He was one of the vice-presidents of the Armenian Parliament during the Republic and led a delegation to Moscow in April 1920 to negotiate with the communist regime. He left Armenia after its sovietization in 1921, and settled in Paris, Cairo, and eventually in Beirut. He was one of the founders of the Hamazkayin cultural association in Cairo (1928). The next year, he was founding principal of the Nshan Palandjian Djemaran (College), Beirut, from 1929 until his death. One of many authors banned in Armenia for his political views, a volume of his plays was exceptionally published in Soviet Armenia in 1968. Levon Shant is regarded by many as the greatest Armenian playwright. His plays The Emperor and Ancient Gods remain among the most frequently staged Armenian dramas. The latter revolutionized the Armenian literary world when it was premiered in Tiflis in 1913. Translated into English, German, Italian, French, and Russian, it was directed by Konstantin Stanislavski in 1917.

Works 
The Egoist («Եսի մարդը»), 1901
For Someone Else («Ուրիշի համար»), 1903
On the Road («Ճամբուն վրայ»), 1904
Ancient Gods («Հին աստուածներ»), 1908
The Princess of the Fallen Castle («Ինկած բերդի իշխանուհին»)
The Emperor («Կայսրը»), 1916

References

External links 

Levon Shant's play the Ancient Gods. Translated into English by Anne T. Vardanian (First act only).
Levon Shant's play The Princess of the Fallen Castle. Translated into English by Anne T. Vardanian (First act only).
Levon Shant's play The Emperor. Translated into English by Anne T. Vardanian (Prologue only).

Armenian male poets
Symbolist poets
Armenians from the Ottoman Empire
1951 deaths
1869 births
Writers from Istanbul
People of the First Republic of Armenia
Armenian political philosophers
Gevorgian Seminary alumni